The 1936 Wisconsin gubernatorial election was held on November 3, 1936.

Incumbent Progressive Governor Philip La Follette won re-election, defeating Republican nominee Alexander Wiley and Democratic nominee Arthur W. Lueck.

Primary elections
Primary elections were held on September 15, 1936.

Democratic primary

Candidates
Arthur W. Lueck, attorney
William D. Carroll, incumbent State Senator

Results

Republican primary

Candidates
John Bowman Chapple, nominee for U.S. Senate in 1932 and 1934
Alexander Wiley, farmer and former Chippewa County district attorney

Results

Progressive primary

Candidates
Philip La Follette, incumbent Governor

Results

General election

Candidates
Major party candidates
Arthur W. Lueck, Democratic
Alexander Wiley, Republican
Philip La Follette, Progressive

Other candidates
August F. Fehlandt, Prohibition, nominee for Lieutenant Governor in 1906
Joseph Ehrhardt, Socialist Labor, nominee for Governor in 1928, 1932 and 1934
Joseph F. Walsh, Union, merchant and farmer

Results

References

Bibliography
 
 

1936
Wisconsin
Gubernatorial
November 1936 events